Many Pieces is the fifth album of the Japanese pop rock group Every Little Thing (ELT), released on March 19, 2003. Many Pieces showed a drastic change in ELT's music, because of the departure of synthesizers and the change in Mochida's vocals.

Track listing

Notes
 co-arranged by Every Little Thing
 co-arranged by Ichiro Ito

Charts

External links
 Many Pieces information at Avex Network.
 Many Pieces information at Oricon.

2003 albums
Every Little Thing (band) albums